Senator Gill may refer to:

Charles R. Gill (1830–1883), Wisconsin State Senate
John Gill Jr. (1850–1918), Maryland State Senate
Nia Gill (born 1948), New Jersey State Senate